Wowkie Zhang or Da Zhang Wei, is a Chinese singer, songwriter, and musician. He is best known as the lead singer, guitarist, and primary songwriter of the rock band, The Flowers.

Early life and career

1983–1998 

Zhang Wei was born on August 31, 1983, in Beijing, China. He completed his elementary school education in the Chongwen District in Beijing, before joining the Children's Cultural Palace to practice singing. At the age of 10, he won first place in the Chongwen District singing competition, as well as the Beijing Middle School and Elementary School Students Singing Competition.

In fourth grade, Zhang Wei, along with other singers in the Children's Cultural Palace, attended the Children's Choir competition in Russia and came in second place. In fifth grade, Zhang Wei became a member of the China Central Television (CCTV) Yinhe Teenage Art Troupe after passing its audition. The Yinhe Teenage Art Troupe has produced many superstars in the contemporary Chinese pop music world, including Faye Wong, Cai Guoqing, Wang Xuechun and Liu Chunyan.

1998–2009 

In February 1998, Zhang Wei and his friends performed in a pub, and met artist agent, Hong Feng, later forming The Flowers together. In June. As Zhang Wei was a common name in the Chinese language,  he became known by his stage name, Da Zhang Wei (大张伟, "the big Zhang Wei").

In January 1999, The Flowers signed with a small Beijing-based Chinese independent label, New Bees Music, and released their first album, On the Other Side of Happiness. The album turned out to be a success with many hit songs like "Stillness", "Disillusion", and "School's Out".

In December 2001, they released their second album, Strawberry Statement ("草莓声明").

In 2002, they won the Media Award in the 2nd Chinese Pop Music.

In 2004, they won the Most Popular Band in the 4th Global Mandarin Pop Chart and the Chinese Music Pioneer Chart. The same year, the band signed a contract with EMI. In June, they released a single CD, You Are My Romeo ("我是你的罗密欧").

From 2004 to 2005, the band experimented with various musical styles including hip hop and techno. In 2005, the band released "Xi Shua Shua"(嘻唰唰), propelling Zhang Wei to household-name status. Xi Shua Shua remains popular overseas, in countries such as Malaysia, as well as in China, especially for parties, square dancing (广场舞) and karaoke.

Xi Shua Shua was included on the band's fourth studio album, Hua Ji Wang Chao, or Blooming Dynasty, released in July 2005. The album won numerous awards in China and sold some 200,000 copies in the forty days after its release.

The Flowers has been referred to as China's "first famous adolescent band". The band disbanded in 2009, and Da Zhang Wei embarked on his solo career afterwards. Since 2009, he has released five albums and over thirteen singles, achieving a record sales of over five million copies.

2009–present 

Zhang became known to younger audiences as a host and TV personality. In 2016, Da Zhang Wei became a co-host for China's top talk show Day Day Up.  

In 2014, Zhang released "Bei-er Shuang", meaning Super Euphoric. He performed the song at China Central TV's Spring Festival Gala, a show viewed by Chinese audiences at home and abroad. The song became an instant national sensation. Psy used "Bei-er Shuang" when he performed with Chinese girl band SNH48 in China.

In 2016, Zhang created a theme song for the advertisement of AliPay's new function, combining Beijing Opera with EDM. He also performed in Heroes of Remix as a guest performer, remixing Beijing folk song Beijing Chick and 1980s rock song the Long March in the song New Beijing Chick (《北京小妞》). In the same show, he also remixed the theme song of 80s cartoon Hulu Brothers (《葫芦娃》). In this show he brought forward the concept of CDM—China Dance Music, encouraging musicians to create music using their own ethnic style, rather than forgetting their own cultural identity in following international trends. 

In 2018, Zhang appeared as a judge on Rave Now. In the show, Da Zhang Wei scouted the winning performer—Jiang Liang. He also scouted a team of EDM musicians who mainly performed in underground pubs and bars in China. His 2018 song, Am a Popping Candy, combines EDM with traditional Yunnan ethnic style and Shandong clapper talk, an ancient storytelling music performance.

His 2018 song "Sunshine, Rainbow, White Pony" gained popularity in Western media after becoming an internet meme because of its chorus, containing the phrase "那个 (nèi ge)", which sounds like the racial slur "nigga".

He and his team created many songs that remix ethnic music with EDM. For example, he created Nezha, which tells the story of a hero from traditional Chinese myth.

Artistry

Influences 

Da Zhang Wei's early influence came from Green Day and Sex Pistols. After he went solo, he turned his interest to EDM. He also tries to incorporate elements of traditional Chinese art forms into his music.

Songwriting 

Unlike many other singers in Mandarin pop, Da Zhang Wei writes his own songs. As of January 2019, he has written over 190 songs. During his time with the Flowers, he was the principal songwriter of all the songs on the band's albums.

References

External links 

1983 births
Living people
Chinese male singers
Singers from Beijing
Internet memes introduced in 2018